The 2016–17 season was 16th season in the top Ukrainian football league for Zorya Luhansk. Zorya competed in Premier League, Ukrainian Cup and UEFA Europa League. Finishing on third place in Preimer League Zorya qualified to Europa League group stage for next season.

Players

Squad information

Transfers

In

Out

Pre-season and friendlies

Competitions

Overall

Last updated:

Premier League

League table

Results summary

Results by round

Matches

Ukrainian Cup

Europa League

Group stage

Statistics

Appearances and goals

|-
! colspan=14 style=background:#dcdcdc; text-align:center| Goalkeepers

|-
! colspan=14 style=background:#dcdcdc; text-align:center| Defenders

|-
! colspan=14 style=background:#dcdcdc; text-align:center| Midfielders

|-
! colspan=14 style=background:#dcdcdc; text-align:center| Forwards

|-
! colspan=14 style=background:#dcdcdc; text-align:center| Players transferred out during the season

Last updated: 31 May 2017

Goalscorers

Last updated: 31 May 2017

Clean sheets

Last updated: 31 May 2017

Disciplinary record

Last updated: 31 May 2017

References

External links 
 Official website

Zorya Luhansk
FC Zorya Luhansk seasons
Zorya Luhansk